Kashmakash Zindagi Ki is an Indian TV series produced by Reasonable Advertising Limited, based on the story of an adopted girl who is hated by everyone in her new family except her father. It premiered on 27 November 2006 on DD National. The story portrays the sour relationships in a family.

The series is one of the long-running television programme of DD National channel, which completed its 300 episodes in June 2008 & 500 episodes on 20 March 2009.

Cast
 Gauri Singh as Tanushree (Tanu) (Sahil's wife)
 Romanchak Arora as Sahil (Aradhana's son, Tanushree, Payal, and Ananya's husband)
 Firoza Khan as Ananya (Sahil love interest)
 Sudha Chandran as Rajyalakshmi Mausi (Antagonist)
 Kishwer Merchant as Mandira (Mayank and Aditya 's mother)
 Deepshikha Nagpal as Aradhana (Sahil and Purva 's mother)
 Amrapali Gupta as Young Tanushree 
 Lata Haya as Devyani (Aradhana's stepmother who is always plotting against her, main antagonist)
 Shakti Singh as Vikram Malhotra (Tanushree's father)
 Shiju Kataria as Purva (Sahil's Sister)
 Raj Singh as Akul Malhotra (Sheetal's husband)
Aakanksha Nimonkar as Arushi Malhotra (Akul's sister) 

 Natasha Rana as Vandita (Tanushree's mother)
 Zarina Wahab as (Pooja`s mother, protagonist)
 Uttara Baokar as Dadi [Rajdev`s mother)
 Anang Desai as Rajdev (Aradhana's stepfather who likes Aradhana more than his own daughter)
 Amit Behl as Anirudh (Mandira's husband)
 Snigdha Pandey as Sheetal, (Tanushree's sister in law), Antagonist
 Vijay Bhatia as Mayank (Mandira's son Pooja's husband)
 Krishna Bharadwaj as Aditya (Mandira's younger son Mayank's brother and Purva's husband)
Richa Soni as Kamya (Mayank ex- wife)
Akriti Singh as Payal
Amit Kaushik as Rohit
 Parineeta Borthakur as Pratima

References

External links
Kashmakash Zindagi Ki News Article on ScreenIndia Weekly

DD National original programming
Indian drama television series